The 1689 list of pubs in Ipswich was a seventeenth century list of inns and taverns in the Borough of Ipswich and surrounding areas. The list identified 24 pubs according to their parish. The largest number were to be found in the St Mary le Tower Parish. If the list was complete, this would indicate around one public house per 500 inhabitants.

References

Pubs in Ipswich
1689 in England
History of Ipswich
History of beer